George Carron Greig (born 16 December 1960), known as Geordie Greig, is an English journalist, the editor-in-chief of The Independent since January 2023, and the former editor of the Daily Mail.

Early life and career
Born 16 December 1960 in Lambeth, London, Greig is the son of Sir Carron Greig and Monica Stourton, granddaughter of the 24th Lord Mowbray, Segrave and Stourton. Members of his father's family have been royal courtiers for three generations — including his twin sister Laura, who was a lady-in-waiting to Diana, Princess of Wales. He attended Eton College and St Peter's College, Oxford.

Greig began his career as a reporter for the South East London and Kentish Mercury newspaper, before joining the Daily Mail and then Sunday Today. He moved to The Sunday Times in 1987, becoming arts correspondent in 1989 and then its American correspondent based in New York in 1991. Greig returned to London in 1995 to become The Sunday Times literary editor and was then appointed editor of Tatler magazine in 1999.

Newspaper editor
He was appointed editor of the Evening Standard in February 2009. During his time as editor the Dispossessed Campaign was launched tackling poverty, illiteracy and unemployment. The campaign led to a Dispossessed Fund which has raised over £9 million for grassroots groups addressing poverty and has helped more than 100,000 people, including the homeless and unemployed.

In 2010 he was appointed editorial director of The Independent, The Independent on Sunday and i (Independent Print Ltd) and the Evening Standard.

In March 2012, Greig became editor of The Mail on Sunday while remaining a director of Independent Print Ltd and the Evening Standard.

He succeeded Paul Dacre as editor of the Daily Mail in September 2018. Two years later, it surpassed The Sun to become the best-selling newspaper in the UK.

Greig supported the UK remaining in the EU in the June 2016 referendum as editor of The Mail on Sunday. He then shifted his stance to supporting Theresa May's withdrawal agreement. Greig was considered to have steered the Daily Mail in a pro-Remain direction, which has been criticised by his predecessor, Paul Dacre, who said "Support for Brexit is in the DNA of both the Daily Mail and, more pertinently, its readers. Any move to reverse this would be editorial and commercial suicide." The Guardian said that Dacre's general criticism of Greig showed "the deep personal and ideological divisions at the top of the newspaper".

In October 2019, Greig said that he hoped the Daily Mail would overtake The Sun as Britain's best-selling newspaper. The Daily Mails profits were reported as stable in 2019, while other tabloids "suffered". Greig observed: "We do defy gravity... Murdoch always used to say there would be two groups standing in the end. Maybe that's going to be right." In June 2020, The Guardian reported that the Daily Mail had surpassed The Sun as the UK's best-selling paper that May. Greig hailed it as a "historic moment" for the newspaper.

His tenure as editor of the Daily Mail came to an end on 17 November 2021. He became consultant editor.

On 4 January 2023, The Independent announced that he was rejoining the digital news outlet as editor-in-chief.

Other interests
In addition to his editorial duties, Greig has literary interests, for instance writing the foreword for the Forward Book of Poetry (1999). His 2011 book, The Kingmaker is about his grandfather, Louis Greig, a rugby international, who became mentor, physician and friend to the young and hesitant Prince Albert, the future King George VI. His influence helped to guide the prince from a stammering, shy schoolboy to become the monarch who saw Britain through the Second World War.

Greig has also written about the life of Lucian Freud. According to his publishers Jonathan Cape:

In 2005, The Observer newspaper termed Greig "Britain's most connected man".

Personal life
On 25 November 1995 he married Kathryn Terry, who is originally from Texas; the couple have three children, a son and two daughters. Greig and his family live in Notting Hill, London.

References 

 

1960 births
Living people
Alumni of St Peter's College, Oxford
Daily Mail journalists
English male journalists
English people of Scottish descent
People educated at Eton College
London Evening Standard people
Geordie